Peruvallur  is a census town in Tirurangadi Taluk, Malappuram district in the state of Kerala, India. Peruvallur has many agricultural fields and about 35 pure water ponds.
 
Calicut International Airport is near Peruvallur, and Kondotty and Chemmad and Chelari are the nearest towns.
Parambil peedika and Kadappdi are quickly emerging market centres with multistorey buildings and shopping complexes.
Many villagers are gulf migrants. As per the current census data, Peruvallur Panchaythu is a census town, and categorised under special Panchaythu.
Peruvallur panchayathu was formed in  October 2000. K. Kuttyali Haji was first president K Koya Kutti Haji was vice-president of the panchayathu. IUML is the major dominant political party of the panchyathu.

Demographics
 India census, Peruvallur had a population of 30,624 with 15,005 males and 15,619 females.

Schools
Najath Islamic School Unghugal
Government International H.S.S Peruvallur
 G.L.P.S Peruvallur Nadukkara 
Alfalah Islamic English medium school 
G.L.P.S Parambilpeedika 
I.M.U.P. School Parachenapuraya
Navabhath Central School Valakandi
Fullbright Pre Nursery School
Akhmup School Chathrathodi
Amlp School Vattapparamb
Government LP School Olakara
Tio Up School Valakkandi
PMSA LP school valakkandi'

Industries
 Bismi Avil Food production 
 Sun Foods
 Perincheeri Oil Mills
 Peruvallur Wood Industries 
 Mezza food products
 Sky Lark Modular Furniture
 Alfa sweet
 A.M. sawmill
 ARAkkal wood industries
 FAMOUS FOOD PRODUCTS

Supermarket
 FMS MART SUPERMARKET
 MK STORES

Transportation
Peruvallur village connects to other parts of India through Feroke town on the west and Nilambur town on the east.  National highway No.66 passes through Pulikkal and the northern stretch connects to Goa and Mumbai.  The southern stretch connects to Cochin and Trivandrum.  State Highway No.28 starts from Nilambur and connects to Ooty, Mysore and Bangalore through Highways.12,29 and 181. The nearest airport is at Kozhikode.  The nearest major railway station is at Feroke.

Primary hospitals 
 C.H.C PARAMBIL PEEDIKA
 POOKOYA THANGAL DYALISIS CENTRE - KADAPPADI
 SMILE LOUNGE DENTAL CLINIC-PARAMBIL PEEDIKA
 ARAKKAL HAJIS AYURVEDA - PARAMBIL PEEDIKA
 PULSE HOMEOPATHIC HEALTH CARE- PARAMBIL PEEDIKA
 A.R Hospital Parambilpeedika
 A.P Poly Clinic Kadappady
 Soorya Multi Speciality Dental Clinic Kadappadi

References

Cities and towns in Malappuram district
Kondotty area

Supermarkets